The Army Aviation Command is the aviation command within the Australian Army responsible for the management and coordination of all army aircraft, as well as the development of future army aviation technology.

Structure
 16th Aviation Brigade
 Army Aviation Training Centre

Commander Aviation Command

See also

 Australian Army Aviation
 United Kingdom Joint Helicopter Command
 Current senior Australian Defence Organisation personnel

References

Australian Army
Leadership of the Australian Defence Force
Military appointments of Australia